Shane Evans (born April 26, 1970) is an American musician. He was the original drummer for the rock band Collective Soul.

Life and career

Early life and career beginnings
Evans was raised in Stockbridge, Georgia. After graduating from Stockbridge High School, he began his career as a professional drummer for the band Marching Two-Step, which included Michele Rhea Caplinger, Ed Roland and Matt Serletic. The band performed local gigs for a few years, but never managed to grow beyond the club scene.

Collective Soul
Evans performed on half of the tracks featured on Hints Allegations and Things Left Unsaid, an album consisting of Ed Roland's songwriting demos. He remained in the band for the albums Collective Soul, Disciplined Breakdown, Dosage, Blender, and Youth. After the release of Youth, session drummer Ryan Hoyle had filled in for Evans on sporadic dates. The band then recorded the EP From the Ground Up in 2005; however, at the end of the year, Evans was dismissed from the group due to excessive drug use. He eventually got sober and joined his former band on stage at the Georgia Music Hall of Fame in September 2009.

Discography

With Collective Soul

Studio albums

Compilation albums

See also
List of drummers

References

External links

1970 births
Alternative rock drummers
American alternative rock musicians
American male drummers
American rock drummers
Collective Soul members
Living people
Musicians from Georgia (U.S. state)
People from Stockbridge, Georgia
20th-century American drummers
21st-century American drummers